Qin'an County is a county in the east of Gansu province of the People's Republic of China. It is under the administration of the prefecture-level city of Tianshui. Its postal code is 741600, and in 1999 its population was 567,553 people. As of 2018, the population is 618,000 people. It is one of the poorest counties of Gansu, being appointed as one of 23 counties part of a provincial poverty alleviation project.

History
The area has been inhabited since prehistoric times, as evidenced by 68 Neolithic cultural sites including the Dadiwan culture.

It is reputedly the county where Zhuge Liang's troops, commanded by Ma Su, were defeated by Zhang He at the Battle of Jieting.

Known historically as Chengji, it vied with Tianshui (then known as Shanggui) as the seat of the medieval province of Qinzhou during the Tang Dynasty and Five Dynasties eras.

Culture 
Qin'an celebrates the Nüwa festival, a sacrifice festival for the mother goddess. It is celebrated yearly on the 15th of the third lunar calendar months.

Administrative divisions
Qin'an County governs 17 towns, which govern over a total of 6 residential communities and 428 villages.
Towns

-Towns are upgraded from Township.

Climate

See also
 List of administrative divisions of Gansu

References

 
Qin'an County
Tianshui